Adigarakallahalli  is a village in the southern state of Karnataka, India. It is located in the Anekal taluk of Bangalore district in Karnataka.

References

External links
 http://Bangalore.nic.in/

Villages in Bangalore Urban district